Yar Mohammad Khan Alakozai bin Abdullah Khan' was the vizier of the Principality of Herat from 1829 to 1842, and the ruler of Herat from 1842 until 1851. He was born in 1790 into the Alakozai tribe. In 1829, he became vizier of Herat. In 1842, he deposed Kamran Shah Durrani and became the new ruler of Herat. He expanded the country's domains to the Chahar Wilayat and Lash-Joveyn before dying in 1851. He was buried in Herat.

References 

Year of death unknown
Emirs of Afghanistan
Pashtun people